Hristici is a village in Soroca District, Moldova.

Notable people
 Gheorghe Năstase

References

Villages of Soroca District